Bruno Splieth (20 January 1917 – 20 July 1990) was a German sailor who competed in the 1960 Summer Olympics and in the 1964 Summer Olympics.

References

1917 births
1990 deaths
German male sailors (sport)
Olympic sailors of the United Team of Germany
Sailors at the 1960 Summer Olympics – Star
Sailors at the 1964 Summer Olympics – Star
Nordic Folkboat class sailors
Kieler Yacht-Club sailors